The 2012 Conference USA men's soccer tournament was the eighteenth edition of the Conference USA Men's Soccer Tournament. The tournament decided the Conference USA champion and guaranteed representative into the 2012 NCAA Division I Men's Soccer Championship. The tournament was hosted by the University of Alabama at Birmingham and the games were played at Regions Park.

Bracket

Schedule

Quarterfinals

Semifinals

Final

Statistics

Goalscorers

Awards

All-Tournament team
Steven Perinovic, Kentucky
Cameron Wilder, Kentucky
Juan Castillo, SMU
Andrew Morales, SMU
T.J. Nelson, SMU
Akeil Barrett, Tulsa
Jake Dobkins, Tulsa
Mark Pais, Tulsa
Tony Rocha, Tulsa
Raphael Ville, UAB
Chase Wickham, UAB

References

External links
 

Conference USA Men's Soccer Tournament
Tournament
Conference USA Men's Soccer Tournament
Conference USA Men's Soccer Tournament